Prem Kumar Ale (born 26 September 1987) is an Indian ex-army soldier and a professional para-badminton player. He made his international debut in 2014. In 2018, he became the national champion of men's singles and men's doubles with his doubles partner Abu Hubaida. 

In 2019, he defeated the top-seeded Thomas Wandschneider in the BWF Para Badminton World Championships. He also won a gold medal at the Dubai Para Badminton International in 2021.

Achievements

BWF Para Badminton World Circuit (1 runner-up) 
The BWF Para Badminton World Circuit – Grade 2, Level 1, 2 and 3 tournaments has been sanctioned by the Badminton World Federation from 2022.

Men's singles

International Tournaments (2 titles, 3 runners-up) 
Men's doubles

Mixed doubles

References 

1987 births
Living people
Indian male badminton players
Indian male para-badminton players